Lake Fifteen is a lake in the U.S. state of Washington.

Lake Fifteen is located in Thurston County's "Section 15", hence the name.

References

Lakes of Thurston County, Washington